The New York Giants are an American football team based in East Rutherford, New Jersey. They are a member of the National Football League (NFL) and play in the NFL's National Football Conference (NFC) East division. In 98 completed seasons, the franchise has won eight NFL championships, including four Super Bowl victories. The Giants have won more than 700 games and appeared in the NFL playoffs 33 times. Though the Giants play home games in East Rutherford, they draw fans from throughout the New York metropolitan area. In 2010, the team began playing in MetLife Stadium, formerly New Meadowlands Stadium.

After Tim Mara paid $500 for the franchise, the Giants joined the NFL in the 1925 season and won their first championship two years later. In 1934, the team won its second title, defeating the Chicago Bears in the NFL Championship Game. The Giants won another championship four years later, and made four appearances in the NFL Championship Game from 1939 to 1946, losing each time. New York won its fourth NFL title in 1956, with a 47–7 win over the Bears in the championship game. From 1958 to 1963, the Giants reached the NFL Championship Game five times, but were defeated on each occasion. Following the 1963 season, the franchise did not return to the playoffs until 1981, only finishing .500 or better five times during the postseason drought.

Behind the defensive play of Lawrence Taylor and the coaching of Bill Parcells, the team won Super Bowl XXI at the end of the 1986 season, giving the team its first championship in 30 years. The Giants won their second Super Bowl four years later, defeating the Buffalo Bills 20–19 in Super Bowl XXV. In the 2000 season, New York returned to the Super Bowl, but lost to the Baltimore Ravens 34–7. The 2007 season saw the Giants win their seventh NFL championship by defeating the New England Patriots 17–14 in Super Bowl XLII. The victory by the Giants prevented a perfect 19–0 season by the Patriots and is widely regarded as one of the greatest upsets in Super Bowl history. After a run of four consecutive appearances in the playoffs from 2005 to 2008, the Giants returned to the Super Bowl in the 2011 playoffs, where they defeated the Patriots 21–17 in a rematch for their eighth title. In the most recent season, 2022, the Giants went 9–7–1 and qualified for the postseason, where they lost to the Philadelphia Eagles in the divisional round.

Table key

Seasons

Statistics above are current as of January 21, 2023. An em dash (—) indicates that the category is not applicable.

All-time records

Notes
The NFL did not hold playoff games until 1932. The team that finished with the best regular season record was awarded the league championship.
In 1933, the league split into East and West divisions.
In 1950, the league switched to American and National conferences.
This was the first championship game in NFL history where an overtime period was played, and has been nicknamed "The Greatest Game Ever Played".
In 1978, the NFL expanded its regular season schedule, which had been 14 games since 1961, to 16 games.
Due to the 1982 NFL strike, the league was split into two conferences, instead of its usual divisional alignment. The season was shortened to nine games, and the top eight teams in each conference earned berths in an expanded 16-team playoff tournament.
The Giants, Dallas Cowboys, and Washington Redskins finished the 1985 season with identical 10–6 records. Dallas was awarded the NFC East title because they had the best head-to-head record among the three teams. The Giants were awarded a wild card berth because of their record in NFC play, while Washington did not qualify for the playoffs due to a head-to-head loss against the San Francisco 49ers, who also finished 10–6.
The 1987 NFL strike caused the schedule to be reduced to 15 games.
The Giants, Philadelphia Eagles, Los Angeles Rams (NFC West), and New Orleans Saints (NFC West) finished the 1988 season with identical 10–6 records. Philadelphia was awarded the NFC East title due to a head-to-head sweep of the Giants in regular season play, while Los Angeles was awarded a wild card berth based on winning percentage in NFC play. The Giants and Saints did not qualify for the playoffs.

References
General

 
 
 
  
 
 
 

Specific

Seasons
New York Giants
seasons
New York Giants seasons